Roger Alan Wade is an American singer-songwriter from Chattanooga, Tennessee.

Career
According to his website, Wade has penned songs about country legends such as Johnny Cash, Waylon Jennings, George Jones and Hank Williams, Jr. He embarked on a solo career with the promotional assistance of his cousin, actor Johnny Knoxville, who occasionally featured Wade's music on his TV show Jackass.

He was featured on the TV show, Wildboyz.  During an appearance on the Howard Stern radio show, Knoxville promoted Wade's songs, which were favorably received by Stern and his audience and given frequent airplay thereafter.

Wade's lyrics satirically and detrimentally deal with topics and stereotypes relating to redneck and honky tonk culture. Before nearly every live song, Roger states, "this is a song about a girl".  He co-wrote the hit song "Country State of Mind" with Hank Williams, Jr.

His songs feature folky arrangements, featuring little or no accompaniment beyond acoustic guitar.  His best known compositions include "BB Gun", "Butt Ugly Slut", "D-R-U-N-K", "Poontang", and "If You're Gonna Be Dumb".  Wade's lesser known works are less hysterical and carry a more lyrical tone including "The First Time I Saw Waylon", "Brainerd Road", and "Jingle Jangle". His song "If You're Gonna Be Dumb You Gotta Be Tough" has appeared in every Jackass film, with Wade's version on the first film and subsequent films featuring covers of the song by Smut Peddlers, Karen O, The Deadly Syndrome, Yelawolf and DJ Paul, and Starcrawler. Wade wrote "The Light Outlives the Star" for a friend of his daughter who died in an automobile accident. It later served as a tribute to his friend and fan, Ryan Dunn, who died in a car accident on June 20, 2011.

Wade has provided voiceover work for WUUQ 97.3 and 99.3 FM, a classic country station in Chattanooga, Tennessee, as well as classic country formatted WWLG "96.7 The Legend" in Atlanta, Georgia from its launch in late 2007 to around 2009. Since 2008, Knoxville and Wade have hosted an hour-long weekly show, "Big Ass Happy Family Jubilee" (named after a Wade song), on Sirius XM's Outlaw Country channel.

Discography

All Likkered Up (2005)
Stoned Traveler (2008)
Deguello Motel (2010)
Too Fat to Fly (2011)
Southbound Train (2012)
Bad News Knockin (2014)
Simmering Rage (2019)

Filmography
 2006: Jackass Number Two
 2005: Wildboyz (1 episode)

Soundtrack
2002: Jackass: The Movie (writer/performer: "If You're Gonna Be Dumb, You Gotta Be Tough")
2003: Grand Theft Parsons (writer/performer: "Rhinestones in the Ashes")
2006: Jackass Number Two (writer/performer: "Sometimes I Don't Know If I'll Make It") (writer: "If You're Gonna Be Dumb, You Gotta Be Tough") (performed by Smut Peddlers))
2007: Jackass 2.5 (writer/performer: "D-R-U-N-K")
2007: Jackass: The Game (writer/performer: "If You're Gonna Be Dumb, You Gotta Be Tough") (writer/performer: "BB Gun")
2009: Nitro Circus (writer/performer: "D-R-U-N-K")
2009: The Wild and Wonderful Whites of West Virginia (writer/performer: "Big Ass Happy Family")
2009: Jackass: The Lost Tapes (writer/performer: "If You're Gonna Be Dumb, You Gotta Be Tough") (writer/performer: "D-R-U-N-K")
2010: Jackass 3D (writer/performer: "Party in My Pants") (writer: "If You're Gonna Be Dumb, You Gotta Be Tough" (performed by Karen O))
2011: Jackass 3.5 (writer/performer: "Too Fat to Fly") (writer: "If You're Gonna Be Dumb, You Gotta Be Tough") (performed by The Deadly Syndrome)
2013: Jackass Presents: Bad Grandpa (writer/performer: "Stoned Traveler")
2018: Action Point (writer/performer: "Drunk, Stoned, & Coked Up")
2022: Jackass Forever (writer/performer: "I Don't Like Being Told What To Do") (chorus writer: "If You're Gonna Be Dumb, You Gotta Be Tough) (performed by DJ Paul, and Yelawolf)
2022: Jackass 4.5 (writer: "If You're Gonna Be Dumb, You Gotta Be Tough") (performed by Starcrawler)
2022: Jackass Shark Week 2.0 (writer "If You're Gonna Be Dumb, You Gotta Be Tough") (performed by Smut Peddlers)

References

Place of birth missing (living people)
Year of birth missing (living people)
American country singer-songwriters
Living people